These are lists of U.S. county name etymologies. Many U.S. states have counties named after U.S. presidents such as Washington, Madison, Polk, Jefferson, etc. Counties are also commonly named after famous individuals, local Native American tribes once in the area (Washoe County, Nevada), cities located within the county, and land or water features (Cerro Gordo County, Iowa, meaning "Fat Hill" in Spanish, and Lake County, Illinois, on Lake Michigan).

Alphabetically
List of U.S. county name etymologies (A–D)
List of U.S. county name etymologies (E–I)
List of U.S. county name etymologies (J–M)
List of U.S. county name etymologies (N–R)
List of U.S. county name etymologies (S–Z)

Miscellaneous
List of U.S. counties named after prominent Confederate historical figures
List of the most common U.S. county name etymologies
List of U.S. counties named after rivers
List of U.S. counties named after women
List of U.S. counties named after presidents of the United States

See also
U.S. state
County (United States)
List of U.S. state name etymologies
List of U.S. place names of Spanish origin

External links
GEOBOPological Survey: The most popular county names, from Washington to Buffalo

Name Etymologies
United States